Canad may refer to:
 Sanjak of Çanad, an Ottoman-era district
 Magyarcsanád, known in Serbian as Čanad, a village in Hungary
 Cenad, known in Serbian as Čanad, a commune in Romania

See also 
 Canad Inns, a chain of hotels
 Canard (disambiguation)
 Csanád (disambiguation)
 Kanad, a town in India
 Canada